Roelof "Roel" Johan Luynenburg (born 23 May 1945) is a retired rower from the Netherlands, who represented his native country twice at the Summer Olympics, starting in 1968. Four years later, he won the bronze medal in the coxless pairs alongside Ruud Stokvis. Luynenburg also won a bronze medal in the coxless fours at the 1966 World Rowing Championships.

References

1945 births
Living people
Dutch male rowers
Rowers at the 1968 Summer Olympics
Rowers at the 1972 Summer Olympics
Olympic rowers of the Netherlands
Olympic bronze medalists for the Netherlands
Sportspeople from Haarlem
Olympic medalists in rowing
World Rowing Championships medalists for the Netherlands
Medalists at the 1972 Summer Olympics